Montgomery Street may refer to:

Montgomery Street in the heart of the Financial District, San Francisco, and home to Montgomery Street Station
New Montgomery Street, the extension of San Francisco's Montgomery Street south of Market Street
Montgomery Street (Baltimore), home to Little Montgomery Street Historic District
Montgomery Street in Louisville, Kentucky, home to Montgomery Street School
Southwest Montgomery Street in Portland, Oregon, home to the PSU Urban Center
Montgomery Street (Savannah, Georgia), home to Savannah Civic Center
Montgomery Street in Syracuse, New York, home to Montgomery Street-Columbus Circle Historic District
Montgomery Street (Manhattan) in New York City's Lower East Side
 Monto, colloquial name for Montgomery Street, Dublin, former red-light district in Ireland